Lourdes Domínguez Lino and María José Martínez Sánchez were the defending champions but Martínez Sánchez did not participate on account of her getting married on July 14.
Domínguez Lino played alongside Anabel Medina Garrigues, but they withdrew from the first round due to a thigh muscle strain from Domínguez Lino.
Catalina Castaño and Mariana Duque Mariño won the final 4–6, 7–5, [10–5] against Eva Hrdinová and Mervana Jugić-Salkić.

Seeds

Draw

Draw

References

External Links
 Main Draw

Swedish Open - Doubles
2012 Women's Doubles
2012 in Swedish women's sport